The governance of the French colony of Acadia has a long and tangled history.  Founded in 1603 by Pierre Dugua, Sieur de Monts, the territory of Acadia (roughly, the present-day Canadian provinces of Nova Scotia, New Brunswick, and Prince Edward Island, and portions of the U. S. state of Maine) was hotly contested in the 17th century.  It was claimed by English and Scottish interests, fought over by competing French governors, and subjected to raids and attacks from English colonists that sometimes resulted in years of occupation of some of its communities.  Most of the non-French claims were given up under the 1667 Treaty of Breda, but the territory did not come completely under French control until three years later.  From 1670 until 1710 the province remained in French hands, except for a brief period in the 1670s when Dutch attackers occupied several Acadian communities.  In 1710 a British expedition including Royal Navy warships and colonial forces from New England captured Acadia's capital for good, and France ceded an ill-defined territory to Britain in the 1713 Treaty of Utrecht.  Although France continued to claim those portions of present-day Maine and New Brunswick that constituted part Acadia, it had no formal government prior to the British conquest of New France in 1760.  The first British governor of Nova Scotia was Samuel Vetch; he took command immediately after the 1710 capture.

Most of Acadia's French governors operated under commissions given by the French crown.  During the periods of turmoil in the mid 17th century, they acted more like proprietary governors, acting primarily in their own interests, or in those of their corporate supporters.  A Scottish proprietary colony named New Scotland (the origin of the name "Nova Scotia") was granted to William Stirling in 1621; this claim was formally abandoned with the 1632 Treaty of Saint-Germain-en-Laye.  Even though there were English claims to the territory under the 1620 charter granted to the Plymouth Council for New England, there was no English settlement of the territory under its authority.  In 1656 two Englishmen, Thomas Temple and William Crowne, acquired the French interest of Charles de Saint-Étienne de la Tour, who had been governing part of the territory under a French commission.  They ruled over his territories until 1670, when they turned their lands over to French governor Hector d'Andigné de Grandfontaine.  Some of the later appointments were not as governors; these were military men who were commissioned as commandant of Acadia, and acted under the direction of the Governor General of New France.

See also 

 Governor of Montreal
 Governor of Plaisance
 Governor of Louisiana

 
-
Acadia